Devil Came to Me may refer to:

Albums
 Devil Came to Me (Dover album), a 1997 album by Spanish rock band Dover.
Songs
 "Devil Came to Me" (Dover song), a 1997 song by Spanish rock band Dover.